Lars Andreas Haug (born 12 April 1975) is a Norwegian jazz musician (tuba), known from a variety of jazz groups and recordings.

Career 
Haug was born in Frogner, Akershus. He obtained his Examen artium from the Music program at Rud High School and a Master at Norges Musikkhøgskole (1994–2001). Thereafter he has been active contributor as a composer in many of the bands he plays in. With the acoustic trio Tri O'Trang (Tri ó trang) he cooperates with Helge Lien (piano) and Torben Snekkestad (saxophones). They have released the recordings Liker (2000), Fordivi (2002), Plays Jon Eberson (2005) and Må (2006). In duo cooperation with Live Maria Roggen he released Tu'Ba (1998).

With the band 1300 Oslo he released a live album Live in the north in 2001 and has been a regular member of the etno-jazz trio Akku from 1996, in a cooperation with the joiker Elfi Sverdrup and the jazz singer Ruth Wilhelmine Meyer. The latter released the albums Akku in 2001. With the trio Moment's Notice featuring Knut Aalefjær (drums) og Vidar Sæther (saxophones), he released the record Moment's notice (2003) and Sorryhappy (2005). In addition, he has been an active member of the band Trygve Seim Ensemble with releases like Sangam (ECM, 2004). He received Statens arbeidsstipend (Norwegian Government artist grant) in 2004–06. In the same period he taught at the Norges Musikkhøgskole (as improvisation and principal instrument teacher).

Haugs with wind orchestra, presents his own compositions on the record Vinterfjøs (Curling Legs, 2005). Here he pick up on his long lasting cooperation with saxophonist Trygve Seim, in addition to Per Oddvar Johansen (drums) and Mats Eilertsen (bass). In 2008 the release of pieces for quintet with the bassoon and trombone followed on the album Fabatune. He toured extensively in Norway for Rikskonsertene (2006), with a solo concert, Luft og kjærlighet, presenting wind instruments for a young audience in, often primary school classes. In 2009 he went to Egypt wit Trygve Seim and Frode Barth, performing several concerts.

Haugen has taken huge steps with his new orchestras (Lars Andreas Haug Quintet and LA Band) and is heading for the really great Norwegian composers and Band leaders.

Discography 
2005: Vinterfjøs (Curling Legs)
2008: Fabatune (Curling Legs)
2015: Soul Twins (Glacier Records), with Steffen Schorn

References

External links 
 Lars Andreas Haug Official Website

20th-century Norwegian tubists
21st-century Norwegian tubists
Norwegian jazz tubists
Avant-garde jazz musicians
1975 births
Living people
Musicians from Sørum